The 2013–14 Cleveland Freeze season was the first season of the Cleveland Freeze professional indoor soccer club. The Freeze, an Eastern Division team in the Professional Arena Soccer League, played their home games at the Soccer Sportsplex in the Cleveland suburb of North Olmsted, Ohio. The team was led by general manager Scott Snider and head coach Hector Marinaro with assistant coach Bruce Miller.

The Freeze earned a 10–6 record in their inaugural regular season and two players were named to the PASL's All-League second team. Cleveland advanced to the Final Four but lost their semi-final match to the Chicago Mustangs.

Season summary
The Cleveland Freeze lost their first PASL match by one goal to the expansion Cincinnati Saints, won their next three matches (including an overtime win over Cincinnati), then lost to the Detroit Waza and the division-leading Chicago Mustangs. The team found its footing again with another win over Cincinnati then won their next five matches as well. They swept season series over the Harrisburg Heat (4 games) and the Illinois Piasa (2 games). 

The Freeze finished the regular season with a 10–6 record, good enough for third place in the Eastern Division and a post-season berth. Cleveland beat the Cincinnati Saints 11–6 in the Eastern Division Semifinal then topped the Detroit Waza 6–5 in the Division Final to advance to the PASL Final Four in Chicago. The Freeze fell 10–3 to the Chicago Mustangs in the semi-final match. Cleveland lost again, this time to the Las Vegas Legends in the consolation match on March 16.

The Freeze participated in the 2013–14 United States Open Cup for Arena Soccer starting with a bye in the Round of 32 and 10–6 win over the Cincinnati Saints on December 14, 2013, in the Round of 16. The Freeze defeated the Harrisburg Heat in the Quarter-finals on Saturday, December 28, and advanced to the Semi-finals. They lost to the Chicago Mustangs on February 22, ending their tournament run.

Broadcast
The entire season, home and away games, are being broadcast online by AmericaOne Sports.

Awards and honors
On January 14, 2014, the Professional Arena Soccer League named midfielder Stefan Ostergren as the PASL Player of the Week. The league cited his outstanding offensive efforts, including 11 consecutive multi-point games and 18 points in Cleveland's three most recent matches.

On February 11, 2014, the PASL announced that defender Josh Grossman and forward Allen Eller would share the spotlight as league's Player of the Week. The league cited Grossman's 7 goals and Eller's PASL-record 8 assists in their team's critical victory over the Cincinnati Saints.

On February 26, 2014, the PASL announced its "All-League" honors. Forward Allen Eller and defender Josh Grossman were named to the All-League Second Team.

Schedule

Regular season

† Game also counts for US Open Cup, as listed in chart below.

Post-season

U.S. Open Cup for Arena Soccer

References

External links
Cleveland Freeze official website

Cleveland Freeze
Cleveland Freeze
Cleveland Freeze 2013
Cleveland Freeze 2013